Melody Dolor Kay (born August 28, 1979) is an American actress. She starred in several movies including Camp Nowhere and The NeverEnding Story III: Escape from Fantasia.

Biography

Melody was born in Michigan to Sally Kopczynski and Frank Kopczynski; the family ran the Melody Lane Motel in Riverview, Michigan, and named their daughter after the motel.

Melody did local theater, starred in Life commercials and acted on and off Broadway.

Melody is married to Wesley Berry and has 4 children. She also has one half sister.

Filmography

Film

Television

References

External links
 
 http://www.ibdb.com/person.php?id=76738 - Melody Kay also served in The Secret Garden musical on Broadway as the understudy of Mary Lennox.

1979 births
Living people
American child actresses
American film actresses
American television actresses
20th-century American actresses
21st-century American actresses